Clofenamide (or diumide) is a low-ceiling sulfonamide diuretic.

References

Diuretics
Sulfonamides
Carbonic anhydrase inhibitors